Ilıca is Turkish for spa, spa town or hot springs. It may refer to:

 Ilıca, Erzurum, Erzurum Province, Turkey
 Ilıca, Çeşme, İzmir Province, Turkey
 Ilıca, Manavgat, Antalya Province, Turkey
 Ilıca, Şavşat, Artvin Province, Turkey
 Ilıca, Mudurnu
 Ilıca, Mut, Mersin Province, Turkey

See also
 Ilidža, Bosnia and Herzegovina
 Paşa Ilıcası, Turkey

bs:Ilidža